The Vivien T. Thomas Medical Arts Academy (VTTMAA) is a public high school located in Baltimore, Maryland, United States.

See also
 Vivien T. Thomas

References

External links
 Vivien T. Thomas Medical Arts Academy - Maryland Report Card

Public schools in Baltimore
Public high schools in Maryland